Chatham Square is a major intersection in Chinatown, Manhattan, New York City. The square lies at the confluence of eight streets: the Bowery, Doyers Street, East Broadway, St. James Place, Mott Street, Oliver Street, Worth Street and Park Row. The small park in the center of the square is known as Kimlau Square and Lin Ze Xu Square.

History

Chatham Square was named for William Pitt, 1st Earl of Chatham and Prime Minister of Great Britain before the American Revolution. Pitt Street in the Lower East Side is also named for him, and Park Row was once Chatham Street.

Until about 1820, the square was used as a large open air market for goods and livestock, mainly horses. By the mid-19th century, it became a center for tattoo parlors, flophouses and saloons, as a seedy section of the old Five Points neighborhood. In the 20th century, after The Great Depression and Prohibition, the area was reformed.

Kimlau War Memorial
The Kimlau Memorial Arch was erected by the American Legion, Lt. B.R. Kimlau Post 1291 in 1961 to honor United States service members of Chinese ancestry who have fought and died serving their country. The arch is named after 26-year-old 2nd Lt. Benjamin Ralph Kimlau, an aircraft commander in the 380th Bombardment Group who was shot down on a mission over Los Negros Island on March 5, 1944 during World War II. The memorial was designed by Poy Gum Lee and bears calligraphy by calligrapher and poet Yu Youren (于右任). The New York City Landmarks Preservation Commission designated the memorial as a landmark in June 2021.

There also is a larger-than-lifesize bronze statue of Lin Zexu in the square, sculpted by Li Wei-Si.

Transportation
Chatham Square was a major station on both the Second Avenue Elevated Line and the Third Avenue Elevated Line of the New York City Subway. These lines respectively closed in 1942 and 1955, in anticipation of being replaced by the Second Avenue Subway, which was postponed repeatedly. Phase 1 of the Second Avenue Subway on the Upper East Side opened in 2017. A new station is proposed for Chatham Square as part of Phase 4, though as of 2016, no timeline or funding has been allocated.

Gallery

See also
Chatham Square Cemetery

References
Notes

External links

Squares in Manhattan
Streets in Manhattan
Chinatown, Manhattan